Bełchatów is a city in central Poland with a population of 55,583 as of December 2021.  It is located in Łódź Voivodeship,  from Warsaw.

The Elektrownia Bełchatów, located in Bełchatów, is the largest coal fueled power plant in Europe and one of the largest in the world. It produces 27–28 TWh of electricity per year, or 20% of the total power generation in Poland. 8,000 people work directly for the company that runs the coal mine and electricity plants.

Districts
One municipal division of Bełchatów comprises numerous housing estates including the Budowlanych housing estate located in the central part of the town (close to the "Kultura" cinema, the Municipal Cultural Center, the Town Hall and the church). The estate is also close to the "Rakówka" river and Olszewski Park.

Other municipal divisions of Bełchatów include Dobrzelów District, Grocholice, and the following housing estates:

Cuisine
The officially protected traditional food of Bełchatów (as designated by the Ministry of Agriculture and Rural Development of Poland) is wyborowa krówka bełchatowska, a local type of krówka (traditional Polish candy).

Sports
 Skra Bełchatów – men's volleyball team playing in PlusLiga (Polish top division), 9–time Polish Champions, 7–time Polish Cup winners.
 GKS Bełchatów – men's football team playing in the second division, which also played in Ekstraklasa (top division) in the past.

International relations

Twin towns - sister cities
Bełchatów is twinned with:

  Aubergenville, France
  Myślenice in Poland
  Csongrád in Hungary
  Alcobaça in Portugal
  Tauragė in Lithuania

Former twin towns
  Sovetsk, Russia

In February 2022, Bełchatów suspended its partnership with the Russian city of Sovetsk as a reaction to the 2022 Russian invasion of Ukraine.

Notable people
 Harry Haft (1925–2007), survivor of the Auschwitz concentration camp and a professional boxer in the United States during 1948–1949

Gallery

References

External links

 Official website 
 Jewish community of Bełchatów on Virtual Shtetl

 
Cities and towns in Łódź Voivodeship
Bełchatów County
Sieradz Voivodeship (1339–1793)
Piotrków Governorate
Łódź Voivodeship (1919–1939)
Socialist planned cities